China–Kazakhstan relations refer to the relations between historical China and the Kazakhs up to the modern relations between the PRC and Kazakhstan. Ever since the establishment of diplomatic relations in 1992, political, cultural, and economic ties have developed between the two. The Chinese Communist Party and Kazakhstan's Amanat have good ties. China has said that it values exchanges between the two parties and hopes to strengthen ties and cooperation even further. 

Following the collapse of the Soviet Union and independence of Kazakhstan, China and Kazakhstan have pursued a process of rapprochement and strengthening ties, with a series of border agreements, economic cooperation, and strategic partnership. However, several incidents with regard to Chinese nationalism as well as Xinjiang conflict in recent years have hampered the development process.

Kazakhstan has acknowledged the One China policy, that it recognizes the PRC as the sole legitimate government of "China" and does not recognize the legitimacy of the Republic of China on Taiwan. The PRC has an embassy in Astana; Kazakhstan has one in Beijing.

History 
Historians say that China came in contact with the Kazakhstan region since as early as the 2nd century BC. The Kazakhstan region was very useful between China and the West.

Han dynasty 
During the Han Dynasty, one of Kazakhstan's ancestors, the Wusun, practiced heqin (intermarriage) with the Chinese, marking the beginning of relations. During the rule of Emperor Wu of Han, Zhang Qian was the official dispatched to the Western Regions (西域 xiyu) to help the Wusun against the Xiongnu. Since the Wusun did not want to cooperate with the Xiongnu, they allied with the Han dynasty to defeat the Xiongnu (Han–Xiongnu War).

The Battle of Zhizhi (郅支之戰) was fought in 36 BC between the Han Dynasty and the Xiongnu chieftain Zhizhi Chanyu. Zhizhi was defeated and killed. The battle was probably fought near Taraz on the Talas River in eastern Kazakhstan, which makes it one of the westernmost points reached by a Chinese army (Protectorate of the Western Regions).

Tang 
During the Tang dynasty, China established the Anxi Protectorate. Later in 751 the Battle of Talas was fought in the same area as the Battle of Zhizhi.

Mongols 
In the 13th century, Genghis Khan briefly unified the two regions under the Mongol Empire.

Ming 
The first Kazakh embassy visited China sometime around 1453. Under the reign of Jiajing (1522–1566), the foundations for a flourishing relationship between Ming China and the Kazakh Khanate were established, but contacts stopped after 1537.

Qing 
The Kazakh Khanate allied with the Qing Dynasty against Dzungar Khanate.

Long before the founding of the Kazakh nation, the Kazakhs established ties with the Tarim Basin region. In 1456, Kelie (克烈) and Jianibieke (贾尼别克) defected to the Moghulistan, which controlled the Tarim Basin region. Esen Buqa II gave the western part of the western border in Zhetysu to two Kazakh kings. This provided territory for the initial establishment of the Kazakh khanate. Since then the two countries have joined forces against enemies and intermarried, but they have also fought each other. In the 16th century, a group of Oirat Mongolians crossed the Altai Mountains from the Mongolian Plateau to enter the Dzungarian basin and then entered the Kazakh Steppe. In 1640, the Dzungars unified the various tribes of Oirat Mongolia and formed the Dzungar khanate. In 1680 the Dzungars defeated the Yarkent Khanate in the Tarim Basin region. In the 17th century, the Dzungars defeated the second of three Zhuz's of the Kazakh khanate. The Kazakhs faced a crisis.

By 1755, the Qianlong Emperor sent troops to wipe out the Dzungar Dawachi regime and ordered the recruitment of the Kazakhs. The tribal alliance led by Ablai Khan expressed support for the Qing troops against the Dzungars and flocked to assist the Qing armies. In 1757, Dzungar nobleman Amursana fled to Abulai (阿布赉) after the rebellion failed. Abulai intended to capture Amursana and deliver him to the Qing court. After the Qing defeated the Dzungar and arrived at Lake Balkhash, Abulai and the Kazakh tribes under his rule submitted to the Qing and sent envoys to the Chengde Mountain Resort to provide horses. As a gesture of gratitude, the Qianlong Emperor bestowed the title of Khan on Abulai and let him lead all the Kazakhs. Since then Kazakh tribes have continuously paid tribute to the Qing. Abulai had sent his descendants to Beijing to study, thus spreading the etiquette of China at that time to Central Asia.

Due to the conflict between Russian Empire and Kazakh Khanate, many Kazakhs fled to Qing Dynasty.

In 1862, Russian Cossack cavalry invaded Xinjiang and defeated Manchu troops, occupying 580,000 square kilometers, including a large part of present-day Kazakhstan. In 1864, China and Russia signed the Treaty of Demarcation of the Northwest Frontier (勘分西北界约记), which ceded part of the territory of China's northwest frontier to Russia. After that, some Kazakh tribes returned to China. The Qing government implemented a 1,000-family system in Kazakh tribes. Kazakhs had to pay taxes and accept direct jurisdiction from the central government. During the Tsar's rule, a large amount of Kazakh land was converted into immigrant areas, the number of livestock was greatly reduced, and the nomadic herdsmen's life deteriorated. Therefore, a large number of Kazakhs migrated to China in order to survive. During the First World War, the Tsar government recruited Kazakhs for military service, causing Kazakhs to rebel and revolt. More than 300,000 nomads fled to China to avoid repression.

Modern bilateral relations 

Before the fall of the Soviet Union, the People's Republic of China and Kazakhstan (while in the Soviet Union) were both communist states.

In 1991, Kazakhstan and China signed an agreement to encourage the development of shop tourism. This trade grew quickly, with about 700,000 citizens of Kazakhstan crossing the border to China in 1992 to buy consumer goods for re-sale in Kazakhstan.

The People's Republic of China and Kazakhstan formed diplomatic relations on January 3, 1992, on the same day that the Kazakh government expressed support for the one-China policy and opposition to the East Turkestan independence movement. The two nations inherited a border dispute from the relations of China and the USSR, which they addressed with their first boundary agreement in April 1994, a supplementary agreement in September, 1997, and their second supplementary boundary agreement in July 1998 to mark their  shared border. 

In 1993, the First President of Kazakhstan Nursultan Nazarbayev made an official visit to Beijing at the invitation of the then-Chinese President Jiang Zemin. Since then, the leaders of China and Kazakhstan have frequently exchanged high-level official visits. In 1996, both nations became co-founders of the Shanghai Cooperation Organisation. New Kazakh President Kassym-Jomart Tokayev was educated in China.

China and Kazakhstan have promoted a rapid expansion of commerce and partnership over economic development, especially in harnessing Kazakhstan's oil, natural gas, minerals and other major energy resources. Kazakhstan proposed the creation of an oil pipeline to China, and the two countries signed an agreement in 1997 to build it. This pipeline became the first between China and any Central Asian country.

Owing to rapidly expanding domestic energy needs, China has sought to obtain a leading role in cultivating and developing energy industries in Kazakhstan. Along with operating four smaller oil fields, the China National Petroleum Corporation in 2005 bought Petrokazakhstan, that was the former Soviet Union's largest independent oil company, for US$4.18 billion and spent another US$700 million on a pipeline that will take the oil to the Chinese border. Petrokazakhstan was the largest foreign purchase ever by a Chinese company. By 2016, Chinese companies (e.g. China National Petroleum Corporation, Sinopec and other) invested more than US$20 billion in the petroleum sector of Kazakhstan.

In 2009 China lent $10 billion to Kazakhstan and gained a stake in MangistauMunaiGas.

On October 16, 2013, the Kazakhstan Majilis and China's Standing Committee of the National People's Congress (NPCSC) signed a memorandum of understanding. The agreement is the most important legislations signed between the two nations that further bilateral relations. The legislation helps both parliaments meet together to discuss bilateral issues amongst one another.

The Chinese government says that Kazakhstan recognizes the PRC as representing all of China and supports Chinese unification.

Strategic cooperation 
Aimed at bolstering regional partnership on regional security, economic development and fighting terrorism and drug trafficking amongst Central Asian nations, Kazakhstan and China become co-founders of the Shanghai Cooperation Organisation (SCO). In developing ties with China, Kazakhstan aims to balance the geopolitical and economic influence of its northern neighbour Russia. However, potential conflicts exist around China's cultural ties between the Kazakh people and the Uighurs of China's Xinjiang province, which could influence a Uighur separatist movement. China also aims to prevent the growth of U.S. influence in the region and the possible establishment of American air bases in Kazakhstan. In 1997, both nations signed an agreement to reduce the presence of military forces along the common border along with Kyrgyzstan and Tajikistan.

The SCO aims to reduce the "three evils" of terrorism, separatism, and extremism. That objective has at the forefront of China's diplomatic dealings in Kazakhstan and elsewhere since 1997.

Border and territorial disputes

The origins of the border line between China and Kazakhstan date back to the mid-19th century, when the Russian empire was able to establish its control over the Lake Zaysan region. The establishment of the border between the Russian Empire and the Qing Empire, not too different from today's Sino-Kazakh border was provided for in the Convention of Peking of 1860; the actual border line pursuant to the convention was drawn by the Protocol of Chuguchak (1864), leaving Lake Zaysan on the Russian side. The Qing Empire's military presence in the Irtysh basin crumbled during the Dungan revolt (1862–77). After the fall of the rebellion and the reconquest of Xinjiang by Zuo Zongtang, the border between the Russian and the Qing empires in the Irtysh basin was further slightly readjusted, in Russia's favor,  by the Treaty of Saint Petersburg (1881).

After the Xinhai Revolution and the Chinese Civil War, the October Revolution and the Russian Civil War in Russia, the Sino-Russian border became the PRC-USSR border. However, the Chinese and Soviet authorities were not always in agreement where the border line run on the ground, which led, in particular to a border conflict east of lake Zhalanashkol in August 1969.

When Kazakhstan became an independent country, around 2,420 square kilometers of land was disputed with China. A border treaty between the two nations was signed in Almaty on April 26, 1994, and ratified by the Kazakh president on June 15, 1995. China received around 22% of the total disputed territory, and Kazakhstan received the remaining 78%.

A narrow strip of hills east of Zhalanashkol which the USSR and China had contested in 1969 became recognized as part of China. To delineate certain small sections of the border more precisely, additional agreements were signed on 24 September 1997 and 4 July 1998. Over the next several years, the border was demarcated on the ground by joint commissions. According to the commissions protocols and maps, the two countries' border line is 1782.75 km long, including 1215.86 km of land border and 566.89 km of border line run along (or across) rivers or lakes. The commissions' work was documented by several joint protocols, finalized with the Protocol signed in Beijing on May 10, 2002.

According to MIT Professor Taylor Fravel, "The collapse of the Soviet Union might have presented China with an ideal opportunity to regain the more than 34,000 square kilometers of territory it claimed in Central Asia. In the context of ethnic unrest, however, China chose to improve ties with the newly independent states to deny external support to separatist groups in Xinjiang."

China compromised in territorial disputes with central Asian republics in order to secure their support for stability in Xinjiang. According to Fravel, "China needed cooperation with its neighbors to prevent the spread of pan-Islamic and pan-Turkic forces to the region, limit external support for separatists within Xinjiang, and increase cross-border trade as part of a broader strategy to reduce tensions among ethnic groups through development."

In May 2020, Chinese websites Tuotiao.com claimed that Kyrgyzstan and Kazakhstan were part of China before being taken by Russia. This has drawn criticism from Kazakhstan and Chinese ambassador was summoned in protest, nonetheless it has renewed the fear of Chinese territorial claim in Kazakhstan as well as Central Asia.

Chinese claim of "unknown pneumonia" from Kazakhstan
On 9 July 2020, the Chinese embassy in Kazakhstan issued a warning which stated that an unidentified strain of pneumonia with a death rate which was "much higher" than the one which is caused by COVID-19 was spreading in several Kazakh cities. It said that the provinces of Atyrau and Aktobe and the city of Shymkent had been effected and nearly 500 cases reported. However, the next day, the Kazakh Health Ministry dismissed the claim by China's embassy and media as "fake news". Michael Ryan, a top official for the World Health Organization's Health Emergencies Program, says that the outbreak in Kazakhstan is likely to be COVID-19 cases that "just have not been diagnosed correctly."

Cross-border water management
The two most important rivers of eastern Kazakhstan, the Irtysh and the Ili, flow from China. Their waters are extensively used for irrigation and urban water supply in both countries (in particular, via China's Irtysh–Karamay–Ürümqi Canal and Kazakhstan's Irtysh–Karaganda Canal). Besides, the Ili is the main source of water for Kazakhstan's Lake Balkhash, and the smaller Emil River, also flowing from China, supplies water to Kazakhstan's Lake Alakol. Accordingly, since the 1990s, the increasing use of the two transboundary rivers' water in China has been of concern for Kazakhstan's environmentalists and politicians. Bilateral negotiations are periodically conducted on the related issues.

Cultural ties 
Some say Kazakhstan is the most influential Central Asian country and is an important gateway for cultural exchanges between China and Central Asia. Kazakhstan advocates solving global issues via mutual cooperation and relies on supranational organizations to achieve cooperation between civilizations. Kazakhstan is not only a representative of Central Asia, but also the embodiment of Muslim civilization and has influence around the world. Thus China can learn from Kazakhstan and the two from each other mutually. The countries can set up an example of cross-cultural cooperation so that the people of Central Asia and China can better understand each other.

Indeed, President Nazarbayev once said that both China and Kazakhstan have a long common history, similar traditions and cultures, and are multi-ethnic countries. Therefore, cultural exchanges between the two countries are very important. In August 1992, the Chinese and Kazakh governments signed the "Agreement on Cultural Cooperation between the Government of the People's Republic of China and the Government of the Republic of Kazakhstan" (中华人民共和国政府和哈萨克斯坦共和国政府文化合作协定). The Agreement serves as a platform for guiding cultural exchanges between the two countries. The two cultures hold cultural activities on the basis of the Agreement.

Beijing held a "Kazakhstan culture day" (it actually lasted more than one day, between 2013 November 5–8). Ürümqi stages Kazakh huaju (话剧, dramas), which have even been attended by numerous leaders of the province. The city also hosted a Kazakh film premiere. China and Kazakhstan jointly applied for a section of the Silk Road to become a world heritage site, and the application was approved. Kazakhstan and China designated 2017 as the 'year of tourism' between the two countries.

Migration 
Since 2000 the number of Chinese immigrants in Kazakhstan has increased significantly. According to a 2010 study, 68% of Kazakhs said they lived alongside Chinese citizens in their cities; 56% thought there were not that many Chinese, while 36% thought there were many. Most thought that the Chinese were there to find jobs (57%) and do business (49%). A smaller number thought they were there for other purposes, including marriage (8%), acquisition of citizenship (6%), and acquisition of property (4%). Tensions over Chinese workers in Kazakhstan have sometimes led to protests.

Kazakhstan has more than 100,000 Donggan people (東干人) who fled from Xi'an, Shaanxi province more than 100 years ago. After the Chinese economic reform, they went to Xinjiang to do trade and imported technology from Xi'an to develop Kazakhstan's economy. As for Kazakhs in China, most live in northern Xinjiang, with a smaller number in Gansu and Qinghai. According to data from mid-2014, China has nearly 8,000 Kazakh students, and Kazakhstan also has Chinese students.

In recent years, with more ethnic Kazakhs in China persecuted and imprisoned in Xinjiang re-education camps, many have fled from places like the Ili Kazakh Autonomous Prefecture into neighboring Kazakhstan.

See also
 Foreign relations of China
 Foreign relations of Kazakhstan

Bibliography

References 

 
Bilateral relations of Kazakhstan
Kazakhstan